Ceylon competed at the 1960 Summer Olympics in Rome, Italy. Five competitors, all men, took part in five events in four sports.

Athletics

 Linus Diaz

Boxing

 Weerakoon Dharmasiri
 Mohandas Liyanage Sumith

Cycling 

One cyclist represented Ceylon in 1960.

Individual road race
 Maurice Coomarawel

Swimming

 Tony Williams

References

External links
Official Olympic Reports

Nations at the 1960 Summer Olympics
1960
1960 in Ceylon